Darwinia grandiflora is a flowering plant in the family Myrtaceae. It is a dense, mat forming, prostrate shrub with clusters of tubular red flowers and is endemic to New South Wales.

Description
Flowering occurs usually from July to October and the fruit is a small  in diameter single seed.

Taxonomy and naming
This darwinia was  described in 1867 by English botanist George Bentham as Darwinia taxifolia var.  grandiflora. In 1917 Richard Thomas Baker & Henry George Smith raised the variety to species status to Darwinia grandiflora and the description was published in Journal and Proceedings of the Royal Society of New South Wales. The specific epithet (grandiflora) refers to the "large flowers".

Distribution and habitat
Darwinia grandiflora grows in wet heath, damp sandy soil and rocky outcrops south of Sydney on the  Woronora Plateau and in the Illawarra region.

References

grandiflora
Flora of New South Wales
Plants described in 1867
Taxa named by Richard Thomas Baker